The Zusha is a river in Tula and Oryol Oblast in Russia, a right tributary of the Oka. The length of the river is 234 km. The area of its basin is 6,950 km². The Zusha freezes up in early December and stays icebound until late March. The Neruch is its biggest tributary. The Zusha is navigable from Mtsensk.

Notes and references

Rivers of Oryol Oblast
Rivers of Tula Oblast